Aegion Corporation is an American multinational company involved in the construction, maintenance, protection, rehabilitation, engineering and design of infrastructure projects for a wide range of industries, including oil and gas upstream/midstream/downstream facilities, power plants, food manufacturing, water, mining, and wastewater.

Aegion's products and services protect against the corrosion of industrial pipelines and rehabilitate and strengthen water, wastewater, energy, and mining piping systems as well as buildings, bridges, tunnels and waterfront structures. The company engages in the provision of engineering, procurement, construction, maintenance, and turnaround services for various energy-related industries.

Operations
Aegion operates through three distinct platforms: Corrosion Protection, Infrastructure Solutions, and Energy Services. The Aegion family of companies include Aegion Coating Services, Corrpro, Fyfe, Fibrwrap, Instituform, Underground Solutions, AllSafe, Brinderson, P2S Serv Tech, and Schultz.

The company's business activities include engineering, construction, safety, turnaround and maintenance services, manufacturing, distribution, cured-in-place pipe (CIPP), installation, coating and insulation, cathodic protection, research and development and licensing.

References

External links
Aegion Official Website
SnapADU General Contractor

Construction and civil engineering companies of the United States
Natural gas pipeline companies
Oil pipeline companies
Companies based in Missouri
Companies formerly listed on the Nasdaq